Ikki Tousen is a Japanese manga series written and illustrated by Yuji Shiozaki. Based on the Chinese novel Romance of the Three Kingdoms, the story's plot focuses on an all-out turf war in the Kanto region of Japan, where seven rival schools—Nanyo Academy, Kyosho Academy, Seito Academy, Yoshu Academy, Rakuyo High School, Gogun High School, and Yoshu Private School—fight each other for territorial supremacy. The series' main protagonist is Hakufu Sonsaku who is the descendant of the legendary warrior Sun Ce. Hakufu transfers to Nanyo Academy under her mother's orders. The characters in the series are in fact Japanese readings of the characters involved in Romance of the Three Kingdoms.

Ikki Tousen began monthly serialization in the seinen manga magazine Comic GUM by Wani Books. The first tankōbon was released on October 2000, with a total of 24 volumes available in Japan as of September 25, 2015. The manga was licensed in North America and the United Kingdom by Tokyopop under the title of Battle Vixens, and sold fifteen volumes between April 6, 2004 and April 27, 2010. The manga is also licensed in Australia and New Zealand by Madman Entertainment, in France by Panini Comics, in Argentina and Spain by Editorial Ivrea, in Germany by Carlsen Comics (under the title of "Dragon Girls"), and in China by Sharp Point Press.

A 13-episode anime adaptation of Ikki Tousen produced by J.C. Staff and directed by Takashi Watanabe aired on AT-X between July 30 and October 22, 2003. So far, there are five seasons produced.

Volume list

References

External links

Ikki Tousen official website by Tokyopop

Ikki Tousen chapters
Ikki Tousen